The 2013 Old Dominion Monarchs football team represented Old Dominion University in the 2013 NCAA Division I FCS football season. They were led by fifth-year head coach Bobby Wilder and played their home games at Foreman Field at S. B. Ballard Stadium. This season was season one of a two-year transition to the NCAA Division I Football Bowl Subdivision (FBS), where the Monarchs became a member of Conference USA (C-USA) in 2014. As a result, the Monarchs competed as a FCS independent and were ineligible for the FCS playoffs.

Schedule

All Independent Team
Coach of the Year - Bobby Wilder
Offensive Player of the Year - Taylor Heinicke, QB

References

Old Dominion
Old Dominion Monarchs football seasons
Old Dominion Monarchs football